Ani Serebrakian (born 7 February 1989) is an alpine skier from Armenia.  She competed for Armenia at the 2010 Winter Olympics.  She competed in the giant slalom and slalom events.

References

External links
 
 
 

1989 births
Living people
Armenian female alpine skiers
Olympic alpine skiers of Armenia
Alpine skiers at the 2010 Winter Olympics